Varskhvaran (also Romanized as Varskhvārān, Varakshvārān, Varaskhvāran, and Vereskeh Vārān) is a village in Doboluk Rural District, Arjomand District, Firuzkuh County, Tehran Province, Iran. At the 2006 census, its population was 463, in 141 families.

References 

Populated places in Firuzkuh County